Honey Lake (also Vienna) is an unincorporated community located in Racine and Walworth Counties, Wisconsin, United States.

The Walworth County portion is located within the town of Spring Prairie, and the Racine County portion is part of the village of Rochester.

References

Unincorporated communities in Walworth County, Wisconsin
Unincorporated communities in Racine County, Wisconsin
Unincorporated communities in Wisconsin